German submarine U-345 was a Type VIIC U-boat of Nazi Germany's Kriegsmarine during World War II.

She carried out no patrols. She did not sink or damage any ships.

She was damaged beyond repair on 13 December 1943 and mined in December 1945.

Design
German Type VIIC submarines were preceded by the shorter Type VIIB submarines. U-345 had a displacement of  when at the surface and  while submerged. She had two shafts and two  propellers.

U-345 was fitted with five  torpedo tubes (four fitted at the bow and one at the stern), fourteen torpedoes, one  SK C/35 naval gun, 220 rounds, and four twin  C/30 anti-aircraft guns. The boat had a complement of between forty-four and sixty.

Service history
The submarine was laid down on 9 July 1942 at the Nordseewerke yard at Emden as yard number 217, launched on 11 March 1943 and commissioned on 4 May 1943 under the command of Oberleutnant zur See Ulrich Knackfuß. U-345 served with the 8th U-boat Flotilla from 4 May 1943. She was hit during a USAAF raid on Kiel on 13 December 1943. The damage was severe enough that she was paid off on the 23rd. After the German surrender in May 1945, she was mined off Warnemünde, (north of Rostock), in December.

References

Bibliography

External links
 

German Type VIIC submarines
U-boats commissioned in 1943
U-boats sunk in 1945
1943 ships
Ships built in Emden
World War II submarines of Germany
Maritime incidents in December 1943
Maritime incidents in December 1945